Boykiye Dvoriki is a rural locality (a khutor) in Loznovskoye Rural Settlement, Dubovsky District, Volgograd Oblast, Russia. The population was 103 as of 2010. There are 3 streets.

Geography 
Boykiye Dvoriki is located in steppe, 28 km northwest of Dubovka (the district's administrative centre) by road. Pryamaya Balka is the nearest rural locality.

References 

Rural localities in Dubovsky District, Volgograd Oblast